The Yucatán box turtle (Terrapene yucatana) is a species of box turtle endemic to Mexico. It is sometimes treated as a subspecies of Terrapene carolina.

Geographic range
It is found in the Mexican state of Yucatán.

Description
Its shell is light-colored with some star-shaped dark spots. Its head is also light-colored. It has four toes on each foot.

References

Terrapene
Reptiles of Mexico
Reptiles described in 1895